Bible Students refers to followers of the Bible Student movement and a number of related religious communities:
 Dawn Bible Students Association
 Free Bible Students
 Jehovah's Witnesses
 Laymen's Home Missionary Movement